Hoya may refer to:

Places
Hoya, Germany, a city in Lower Saxony, Germany
County of Hoya, a former state in present Germany
Hoya, Tokyo, now incorporated within Nishi-tokyo, Tokyo, Japan
Hoya, Hpruso, a place in Hpruso Township, Kayah, Myanmar
Hoya, Spain, a hamlet in Lorca, Spain
Hoya, Zimbabwe, a ward of Zimbabwe

Other uses
Hoya (plant), a genus of flowering plants
Hoya (singer), a former member of the South Korean band Infinite
Hoya Corporation, a Japanese company that manufactures optical equipment
The Hoya, a campus newspaper at Georgetown University
Georgetown Hoyas, the athletic teams of Georgetown University
Hoya (speed cubing method), a method to solve a 4x4x4, 5x5x5 and other big cubes.

See also 
Heuer 
Hoia (disambiguation)
Hoya Saxa, the college yell of Georgetown University
Hoyas (EP) by S. Carey